The white-chinned thistletail or  (Asthenes fuliginosa) is a species of bird in the family Furnariidae. It is found in Colombia, Ecuador, Peru, and Venezuela. Its natural habitats are subtropical or tropical moist montane forests and subtropical or tropical high-altitude grassland.

Description
18.5–19 cm in length.  Chestnut-brown above with narrow white eye-ring and short pale grayish superciliary.  Very long chestnut-rufous tail.  Uniform gray below with whitish chin patch.

Subspecies
The white-chinned thistletail has four subspecies:
 Asthenes fuliginosa fuliginosa (Lafresnaye, 1843) - Colombia, Venezuela and Ecuador
 Asthenes fuliginosa fumigata (Borrero, 1960) - Colombia
 Asthenes fuliginosa peruviana (Cory, 1916) - northern Peru
 Asthenes fuliginosa plengei (O'Neill & Parker, 1976) - central Peru

References

white-chinned thistletail
Birds of the Colombian Andes
Birds of the Ecuadorian Andes
Birds of the Peruvian Andes
white-chinned thistletail
Taxonomy articles created by Polbot